The Rockford Fury was a Premier Basketball League (PBL) team based in Rockford, Illinois.

Franchise History

Inaugural Season - 2006-07

The team began existence as the Hammond Rollers of the ABA's current incarnation (based out of Hammond, Indiana, and playing at the Hammond Civic Center), before being sold to Tom McGinn (owner of the Quad City Riverhawks), relocated to Dixon, Illinois, and renamed the Sauk Valley Rollers.   

The Rollers finished the regular season 16-16, good for third place in the White Conference, Northern Division, and earning them a #17 ranking in the ABA playoffs, before losing to their brother franchise, the Quad City Riverhawks, by a score of 100–86.

Second Season - 2007-08
The team moved to Rockford College in Rockford, Illinois for 2007–08.  Also, because of the "Rollers" nickname and logo referenced gambling, they changed their name to the Rock River Fury. .

On August 27, the Fury announced they would be moving to the PBL along with their brother franchise, the Quad City Riverhawks.

End of the line
The Fury met their end in the summer of 2008 when the PBL added a rule prohibiting one owner having multiple teams in the league.  The Riverhawks were maintained and the Fury folded.

References

External links
 Official website of the Rockford Fury

Former Premier Basketball League teams
Basketball teams in Illinois
Fury